Corymbia porrecta, commonly known as the grey bloodwood, is a species of small tree that is endemic to the Northern Territory. It has rough, tessellated bark on the trunk and branches, broadly lance-shaped to egg-shaped adult leaves, flower buds usually in groups of seven, creamy white flowers and urn-shaped to barrel-shaped fruit.

Description
Corymbia porrecta is a tree that grows to a height of  but often much less, and forms a lignotuber. It has rough, tessellated greyish bark on the trunk and branches. Flowering occurs from January to April and the flowers are creamy white.

Taxonomy and naming
This bloodwood was first formally described in 1953 by Stanley Thatcher Blake who gave it the name Eucalyptus porrecta and published the description in the Australian Journal of Botany. In 1995 Ken Hill and Lawrence Alexander Sidney Johnson changed the name to Corymbia porrecta. The specific epithet is from the Latin porrectus meaning "stretched outwards and forward", possibly referring to the long broad leaves of the crown.

Distribution and habitat
The grey bloodwood usually grows in tall woodland on sandy, gravelly soils in the north-west of the Northern Territory, between Litchfield and Darwin, east to Jabiru, the Coburg Peninsula and on Bathurst and Melville Islands.

Ecology
Following a fire the tree is a facultative resprouter depending on conditions such as moisture and the fire intensity.

See also
 List of Corymbia species

References

porrecta
Myrtales of Australia
Flora of the Northern Territory
Plants described in 1953